Katja K, also known as Katja Kean and Sussi la Cour Dollenz (born 7 February 1968 in Denmark as Sussi la Cour), is a Danish former pornographic actress, businesswoman, actress, singer, author, and media personality. Kean studied experience leadership (Danish oplevelsesledelse) at Roskilde Universitetscenter (RUC) in Denmark. She married Constance co-star Marco Dollenz whose last name she took in 2016. They live at Sitges, Spain. She owned an underwear company, which she ran for five years. Author Henrik List wrote a biography (based on interviews with her) titled Katja KXXX – Stjerne I Syndens By.

Acting career 
Kean starred in two adult films produced by Academy Award-nominated filmmaker Lars von Trier's company Zentropa: Constance (1998) and Pink Prison (1999). In 2002, Kean changed her stage name from "Katja Kean" to "Katja K". Kean had a prominent role in the Danish sitcom Langt fra Las Vegas (Far from Las Vegas). She sang with Danish musician Dario Campeotto on his single "Save Your Love". She also appeared on a Filur track called "Sunset Boulevard". Per the Internet Adult Film Database, she has starred in 30 cover films, and was a contract girl for the American production company called Sincity, based in California. Her adult career was from the year 1997 and ended in 2000, by her own choice.

Awards and nominations

Selective filmography
Constance (1998)
Katja Kean's Sports Spectacular (1998)
Pink Prison (1999)
Buried Treasure (2000)
Watchers (2000)
Langt fra Las Vegas (2001)
Bald Beaver Blast (2005)

References

External links

 "Stjerne i syndens by", excerpt from book by Henrik List, Berlingske Tidende, 26 February 2003.

1968 births
Danish pornographic film actresses
Danish female adult models
Living people
People from Frederiksberg